Pennsylvania's 31st congressional district was one of Pennsylvania's districts of the United States House of Representatives. It existed from 1903 to 1953.

Geography
Created in 1903, the district served portions of the city of Pittsburgh. The district later expanded to serve portions of Allegheny County

Boundaries in 1903
During the 58th Congress, the district served Pittsburgh Wards 1-19 and Ward 23.

Boundaries in 1950
During the 81st Congress, the district served Wards 19, 20, 28, 29, 30, and 32 in Pittsburgh and the following portions of Allegheny County.

 Boroughs served by the 31st District
 Brentwood
 Bridgeville
 Carnegie
 Castle Shannon
 Coraopolis
 Crafton
 Dormont
 Green Tree
 Heidelberg
 Ingram
 McDonald(5th election district)
 McKees Rocks
 Mount Oliver
 Oakdale
 Rosslyn Farms
 Thornburg
 Townships served by the 31st District
 Baldwin
 Bethel
 Collier
 Crescent
 Findlay
 Kennedy
 Moon
 Mount Lebanon
 Neville
 North Fayette
 Robinson
 Scott
 South Fayette
 Stowe
 Upper St. Clair

Population
 188,099 (1900 Census)
 295,063 (1940 Census)

History
This district was created in 1903, then eliminated in 1953.

List of representatives

References

 
 
 Congressional Biographical Directory of the United States 1774–present

31
Former congressional districts of the United States
1903 establishments in Pennsylvania
1953 disestablishments in Pennsylvania
Constituencies established in 1903
Constituencies disestablished in 1953